Elder Signs Press, Inc (aka ESP) is a Michigan-based book publisher distributed through the Independent Publishers Group. It specializes in horror, science fiction, and fantasy titles.

History
ESP was founded in 2003 by William Jones, a gamer and Lovecraftian horror enthusiast. Its initial publications were issues of the Call of Cthulhu fanzine Book of Dark Wisdom. The magazine's format was changed with the third issue to focus on horror fiction and poetry. Eleven issues were published before the magazine was converted to an annual book anthology in 2009.

As a book publisher, ESP is primarily a self-publishing venture for Jones, who has written several novels and edited numerous anthologies released under the imprint. However, the company does publish books and anthologies from other authors and editors. Its first book was Stanley C. Sargent’s Ancient Exhumations +2, a collection of Lovecraftian short fiction published in 2004. The company is best known as a publisher of Cthulhu Mythos material, but it has also published work in genres such as cyberpunk and apocalyptic survival horror.

Authors and anthology editors

James Ambuehl
Tim Curran
Rachel Gray
Lois H. Gresh
CJ Henderson
William Jones
James Lowder
Michael McBride
Richard A. Lupoff
Gene O'Neil
Stanley C. Sargent
John Shirley
Stewart Sternberg
Chelsea Quinn Yarbro

External links

American speculative fiction publishers
Book publishing companies based in Michigan
Companies based in Oakland County, Michigan
Horror book publishing companies
Publishing companies established in 2003
Science fiction publishers
Small press publishing companies